Lənbəran (also, Lambaran, and Lemberan) is the most populous village and municipality in the Barda Rayon of Azerbaijan other than Barda itself. It has a population of 4,666.

References 

Populated places in Barda District